My Name is Kadi is a Nigerian 2016 movie written by Aisha Tisha Mohammed and directed by Bright Wonder Obasi. The Hollywood African Prestigious Awards nomination movie stars Blossom Chukwujekwu, Kenneth Okolie, Tina Mba and Silvia Oluchy.

Premiere 
The movie was premiered at Sheraton Hotel, Abuja in June 2016. In attendance were Former Information Minister, Lai Mohammed, Josephine Ramos, Desmond Utomwen, Grace Amaiye, Femi Gbajabiamila and Desmond Elliot.

Synopsis 
the movie revolves around a girl who misbehaves to the extent that she decided to leave her family and live by her own rules. She eventually met a responsible man who changed her but she battle with different hurdles in keeping him.

Top cast 
Femi Afolabi, Ivy Blessing Agbo, Preach Bassey, Jide Bolarinwa,  Benjamin Chiedu, Blossom Chukwujekwu,  Kelvin Godwin, Tina Mba, Aisha Mohammed, Obinna Nwaka, Kenneth Okolie, Sylvia Oluchy, Chineye Onah, Bella Onuh, Vincent Opurum, Josephine Ramos, Gertrude Seibi

Awards and nominations 
My name is Kadi got three nominations at the 2017 Hollywood and African Prestigious Awards, in California and it won the Most Outstanding Actress in a Motion Picture Award

References 

2016 films
English-language Nigerian films
Nigerian romance films
Nigerian romantic fiction